Hernán Cortés de Monroy y Pizarro Altamirano, 1st Marquess of the Valley of Oaxaca (1485 – December 2, 1547) was a Spanish conquistador who led an expedition that caused the fall of the Aztec Empire and brought large portions of what is now mainland Mexico under the rule of the King of Castile in the early 16th century. Cortés was part of the generation of Spanish explorers and conquistadors who began the first phase of the Spanish colonization of the Americas.

Born in Medellín, Spain, to a family of lesser nobility, Cortés chose to pursue adventure and riches in the New World. He went to Hispaniola and later to Cuba, where he received an encomienda (the right to the labor of certain subjects). For a short time, he served as alcalde (magistrate) of the second Spanish town founded on the island. In 1519, he was elected captain of the third expedition to the mainland, which he partly funded. His enmity with the Governor of Cuba, Diego Velázquez de Cuéllar, resulted in the recall of the expedition at the last moment, an order which Cortés ignored.

Arriving on the continent, Cortés executed a successful strategy of allying with some indigenous people against others. He also used a native woman, Doña Marina, as an interpreter. She later bore his first son. When the Governor of Cuba sent emissaries to arrest Cortés, he fought them and won, using the extra troops as reinforcements. Cortés wrote letters directly to the king asking to be acknowledged for his successes instead of being punished for mutiny. After he overthrew the Aztec Empire, Cortés was awarded the title of Marqués del Valle de Oaxaca, while the more prestigious title of Viceroy was given to a high-ranking nobleman, Antonio de Mendoza. In 1541 Cortés returned to Spain, where he died six years later of natural causes.

Name

Cortés himself used the form "Hernando" or "Fernando" for his first name, as seen in the contemporary archive documents, his signature and the title of an early portrait. William Hickling Prescott's Conquest of Mexico (1843) also refers to him as Hernando Cortés. At some point writers began using the shortened form of "Hernán" more generally.

Physical appearance

In addition to the illustration by the German artist Christoph Weiditz in his Trachtenbuch, there are three known portraits of Hernán Cortés which were likely made during his lifetime, though only copies of them have survived. All of these portraits show Cortés in the later years of his life. The account of the conquest of the Aztec Empire written by Bernal Díaz del Castillo, gives a detailed description of Hernán Cortés's physical appearance:

Early life
Cortés was born in 1485 in the town of Medellín, then a village in the Kingdom of Castile, now a municipality of the modern-day province of Badajoz in Extremadura, Spain. His father, Martín Cortés de Monroy, born in 1449 to Rodrigo or Ruy Fernández de Monroy and his wife María Cortés, was an infantry captain of distinguished ancestry but slender means. Hernán's mother was Catalína Pizarro Altamirano.

Through his mother, Hernán was second cousin once removed of Francisco Pizarro, who later conquered the Inca Empire of modern-day Peru, and not to be confused with another Francisco Pizarro, who joined Cortés to conquer the Aztecs. (His maternal grandmother, Leonor Sánchez Pizarro Altamirano, was first cousin of Pizarro's father Gonzalo Pizarro y Rodriguez.) Through his father, Hernán was related to Nicolás de Ovando, the third Governor of Hispaniola. His paternal great-grandfather was Rodrigo de Monroy y Almaraz, 5th Lord of Monroy.

According to his biographer and chaplain, Francisco López de Gómara, Cortés was pale and sickly as a child. At the age of 14, he was sent to study Latin under an uncle in Salamanca. Later historians have misconstrued this personal tutoring as time enrolled at the University of Salamanca.

After two years, Cortés returned home to Medellín, much to the irritation of his parents, who had hoped to see him equipped for a profitable legal career. However, those two years in Salamanca, plus his long period of training and experience as a notary, first in Valladolid and later in Hispaniola, gave him knowledge of the legal codes of Castile that he applied to help justify his unauthorized conquest of Mexico.

At this point in his life, Cortés was described by Gómara as ruthless, haughty, and mischievous. The 16-year-old youth had returned home to feel constrained life in his small provincial town. By this time, news of the exciting discoveries of Christopher Columbus in the New World was streaming back to Spain.

Early career in the New World

Plans were made for Cortés to sail to the Americas with a family acquaintance and distant relative, Nicolás de Ovando, the newly appointed Governor of Hispaniola. (This island is now divided between Haiti and the Dominican Republic). Cortés suffered an injury and was prevented from traveling. He spent the next year wandering the country, probably spending most of his time in Spain's southern ports of Cadiz, Palos, Sanlucar, and Seville. He finally left for Hispaniola in 1504 and became a colonist.

Arrival
Cortés reached Hispaniola in a ship commanded by Alonso Quintero, who tried to deceive his superiors and reach the New World before them in order to secure personal advantages. Quintero's mutinous conduct may have served as a model for Cortés in his subsequent career.

Upon his arrival in 1504 in Santo Domingo, the capital of Hispaniola, the 18-year-old Cortés registered as a citizen; this entitled him to a building plot and land to farm. Soon afterward, Governor Nicolás de Ovando granted him an encomienda and appointed him as a notary of the town of Azua de Compostela. His next five years seemed to help establish him in the colony; in 1506, Cortés took part in the conquests of Hispaniola and Cuba. The expedition leader awarded him a large estate of land and Taíno slaves for his efforts.

Cuba (1511–1519)
In 1511, Cortés accompanied Diego Velázquez de Cuéllar, an aide of the Governor of Hispaniola, in his expedition to conquer Cuba. Velázquez was appointed Governor of New Spain. At the age of 26, Cortés was made clerk to the treasurer with the responsibility of ensuring that the Crown received the quinto, or customary one fifth of the profits from the expedition.

Velázquez was so impressed with Cortés that he secured a high political position for him in the colony. He became secretary for Governor Velázquez. Cortés was twice appointed municipal magistrate (alcalde) of Santiago. In Cuba, Cortés became a man of substance with an encomienda to provide Indian labor for his mines and cattle. This new position of power also made him the new source of leadership, which opposing forces in the colony could then turn to. In 1514, Cortés led a group which demanded that more Indians be assigned to the settlers.

As time went on, relations between Cortés and Governor Velázquez became strained. Cortés found time to become romantically involved with Catalina Xuárez (or Juárez), the sister-in-law of Governor Velázquez. Part of Velázquez's displeasure seems to have been based on a belief that Cortés was trifling with Catalina's affections. Cortés was temporarily distracted by one of Catalina's sisters but finally married Catalina, reluctantly, under pressure from Governor Velázquez. However, by doing so, he hoped to secure the good will of both her family and that of Velázquez.

It was not until he had been almost 15 years in the Indies that Cortés began to look beyond his substantial status as mayor of the capital of Cuba and as a man of affairs in the thriving colony. He missed the first two expeditions, under the orders of Francisco Hernández de Córdoba and then Juan de Grijalva, sent by Diego Velázquez to Mexico in 1518. News reached Velázquez that Juan de Grijalva had established a colony on the mainland where there was a bonanza of silver and gold, and Velázquez decided to send him help. Cortés was appointed Captain-General of this new expedition in October 1518, but was advised to move fast before Velázquez changed his mind.

With Cortés's experience as an administrator, knowledge gained from many failed expeditions, and his impeccable rhetoric he was able to gather six ships and 300 men, within a month. Velázquez's jealousy exploded and he decided to put the expedition in other hands. However, Cortés quickly gathered more men and ships in other Cuban ports.

Conquest of Mexico (1519–1521)

In 1518, Velázquez put Cortés in command of an expedition to explore and secure the interior of Mexico for colonization. At the last minute, due to the old argument between the two, Velázquez changed his mind and revoked Cortés's charter. Cortés ignored the orders and, in an act of open mutiny, went anyway in February 1519. He stopped in Trinidad, Cuba, to hire more soldiers and obtain more horses. Accompanied by about 11 ships, 500 men (including seasoned slaves), 13 horses, and a small number of cannons, Cortés landed on the Yucatán Peninsula in Mayan territory. There he encountered Geronimo de Aguilar, a Spanish Franciscan priest who had survived a shipwreck followed by a period in captivity with the Maya, before escaping. Aguilar had learned the Chontal Maya language and was able to translate for Cortés.

Cortés's military experience was almost nonexistent, but he proved to be an effective leader of his small army and won early victories over the coastal Indians. In March 1519, Cortés formally claimed the land for the Spanish crown. Then he proceeded to Tabasco, where he met with resistance and won a battle against the natives. He received twenty young indigenous women from the vanquished natives, and he converted them all to Christianity.

Among these women was La Malinche, his future mistress and mother of his son Martín. Malinche knew both the Nahuatl language and Chontal Maya, thus enabling Cortés to communicate with the Aztecs through Aguilar. At San Juan de Ulúa on Easter Sunday 1519, Cortés met with Moctezuma II's Aztec Empire governors Tendile and Pitalpitoque.

In July 1519, his men took over Veracruz. By this act, Cortés dismissed the authority of the Governor of Cuba to place himself directly under the orders of King Charles. To eliminate any ideas of retreat, Cortés scuttled his ships.

March on Tenochtitlán
In Veracruz, he met some of the tributaries of the Aztecs and asked them to arrange a meeting with Moctezuma II, the tlatoani (ruler) of the Aztec Empire. Moctezuma repeatedly turned down the meeting, but Cortés was determined. Leaving a hundred men in Veracruz, Cortés marched on Tenochtitlán in mid-August 1519, along with 600 soldiers, 15 horsemen, 15 cannons, and hundreds of indigenous carriers and warriors.

On the way to Tenochtitlán, Cortés made alliances with indigenous peoples such as the Totonacs of Cempoala and the Nahuas of Tlaxcala. The Otomis initially, and then the Tlaxcalans fought with the Spanish in a series of three battles from 2 to 5 September 1519, and at one point, Diaz remarked, "they surrounded us on every side". After Cortés continued to release prisoners with messages of peace, and realizing the Spanish were enemies of Moctezuma, Xicotencatl the Elder and Maxixcatzin persuaded the Tlaxcalan warleader, Xicotencatl the Younger, that it would be better to ally with the newcomers than to kill them.

In October 1519, Cortés and his men, accompanied by about 1,000 Tlaxcalteca, marched to Cholula, the second-largest city in central Mexico. Cortés, either in a pre-meditated effort to instill fear upon the Aztecs waiting for him at Tenochtitlan or (as he later claimed, when he was being investigated) wishing to make an example when he feared native treachery, massacred thousands of unarmed members of the nobility gathered at the central plaza, then partially burned the city.

 
By the time he arrived in Tenochtitlán, the Spaniards had a large army. On November 8, 1519, they were peacefully received by Moctezuma II. Moctezuma deliberately let Cortés enter the Aztec capital, the island city of Tenochtitlán, hoping to get to know their weaknesses better and to crush them later.

Moctezuma gave lavish gifts of gold to the Spaniards which, rather than placating them, excited their ambitions for plunder. In his letters to King Charles, Cortés claimed to have learned at this point that he was considered by the Aztecs to be either an emissary of the feathered serpent god Quetzalcoatl or Quetzalcoatl himself – a belief which has been contested by a few modern historians. But quickly Cortés learned that several Spaniards on the coast had been killed by Aztecs while supporting the Totonacs, and decided to take Moctezuma as a hostage in his palace, indirectly ruling Tenochtitlán through him.

Meanwhile, Velázquez sent another expedition, led by Pánfilo de Narváez, to oppose Cortés, arriving in Mexico in April 1520 with 1,100 men. Cortés left 200 men in Tenochtitlán and took the rest to confront Narváez. He overcame Narváez, despite his numerical inferiority, and convinced the rest of Narváez's men to join him. In Mexico, one of Cortés's lieutenants Pedro de Alvarado, committed the massacre in the Great Temple, triggering a local rebellion.

Cortés speedily returned to Tenochtitlán. On July 1, 1520, Moctezuma was killed (he was stoned to death by his own people, as reported in Spanish accounts; although some claim he was murdered by the Spaniards once they realized his inability to placate the locals). Faced with a hostile population, Cortés decided to flee for Tlaxcala. During the Noche Triste (June 30 – July 1, 1520), the Spaniards managed a narrow escape from Tenochtitlán across the Tlacopan causeway, while their rearguard was being massacred. Much of the treasure looted by Cortés was lost (as well as his artillery) during this panicked escape from Tenochtitlán.

Destruction of Tenochtitlán
After a battle in Otumba, they managed to reach Tlaxcala, having lost 870 men. With the assistance of their allies, Cortés's men finally prevailed with reinforcements arriving from Cuba. Cortés began a policy of attrition towards Tenochtitlán, cutting off supplies and subduing the Aztecs' allied cities. During the siege he would construct brigantines  in the lake and slowly destroy blocks of the city to avoid fighting in an urban setting. The Mexicas would fall back to Tlatelolco and even succeed in ambushing the pursuing Spanish forces, inflicting heavy losses, but would ultimately be the last portion of the island that resisted the conquistadores. The siege of Tenochtitlán ended with Spanish victory and the destruction of the city.

In January 1521, Cortés countered a conspiracy against him, headed by Antonio de Villafana, who was hanged for the offense. Finally, with the capture of Cuauhtémoc, the tlatoani (ruler) of Tenochtitlán, on August 13, 1521, the Aztec Empire was captured, and Cortés was able to claim it for Spain, thus renaming the city Mexico City. From 1521 to 1524, Cortés personally governed Mexico.

Appointment to governorship of Mexico and internal dissensions

Many historical sources have conveyed an impression that Cortés was unjustly treated by the Spanish Crown, and that he received nothing but ingratitude for his role in establishing New Spain. This picture is the one Cortés presents in his letters and in the later biography written by Francisco López de Gómara. However, there may be more to the picture than this. Cortés's own sense of accomplishment, entitlement, and vanity may have played a part in his deteriorating position with the king:

King Charles appointed Cortés as governor, captain general and chief justice of the newly conquered territory, dubbed "New Spain of the Ocean Sea". But also, much to the dismay of Cortés, four royal officials were appointed at the same time to assist him in his governing – in effect, submitting him to close observation and administration. Cortés initiated the construction of Mexico City, destroying Aztec temples and buildings and then rebuilding on the Aztec ruins what soon became the most important European city in the Americas.

Cortés managed the founding of new cities and appointed men to extend Spanish rule to all of New Spain, imposing the encomienda system in 1524. He reserved many encomiendas for himself and for his retinue, which they considered just rewards for their accomplishment in conquering central Mexico. However, later arrivals and members of factions antipathetic to Cortés complained of the favoritism that excluded them.

In 1523, the Crown (possibly influenced by Cortés's enemy, Bishop Fonseca), sent a military force under the command of Francisco de Garay to conquer and settle the northern part of Mexico, the region of Pánuco. This was another setback for Cortés who mentioned this in his fourth letter to the King in which he describes himself as the victim of a conspiracy by his archenemies Diego Velázquez de Cuéllar, Diego Columbus and Bishop Fonseca as well as Francisco Garay. The influence of Garay was effectively stopped by this appeal to the King who sent out a decree forbidding Garay to interfere in the politics of New Spain, causing him to give up without a fight.

Royal grant of arms (1525)

Although Cortés had flouted the authority of Diego Velázquez in sailing to the mainland and then leading an expedition of conquest, Cortés's spectacular success was rewarded by the crown with a coat of arms, a mark of high honor, following the conqueror's request. The document granting the coat of arms summarizes Cortés's accomplishments in the conquest of Mexico. The proclamation of the king says in part:

We, respecting the many labors, dangers, and adventures which you underwent as stated above, and so that there might remain a perpetual memorial of you and your services and that you and your descendants might be more fully honored ... it is our will that besides your coat of arms of your lineage, which you have, you may have and bear as your coat of arms, known and recognized, a shield ...

The grant specifies the iconography of the coat of arms, the central portion divided into quadrants. In the upper portion, there is a "black eagle with two heads on a white field, which are the arms of the empire". Below that is a "golden lion on a red field, in memory of the fact that you, the said Hernando Cortés, by your industry and effort brought matters to the state described above" (i.e., the conquest). The specificity of the other two quadrants is linked directly to Mexico, with one quadrant showing three crowns representing the three Aztec emperors of the conquest era, Moctezuma, Cuitlahuac, and Cuauhtemoc and the other showing the Aztec capital of Tenochtitlan. Encircling the central shield are symbols of the seven city-states around the lake and their lords that Cortés defeated, with the lords "to be shown as prisoners bound with a chain which shall be closed with a lock beneath the shield".

Death of his first wife and remarriage
 
Cortés's wife Catalina Súarez arrived in New Spain around summer 1522, along with her sister and brother. His marriage to Catalina was at this point extremely awkward, since she was a kinswoman of the governor of Cuba, Diego Velázquez, whose authority Cortés had thrown off and who was therefore now his enemy. Catalina lacked the noble title of doña, so at this point his marriage with her no longer raised his status. Their marriage had been childless. Since Cortés had sired children with a variety of indigenous women, including a son around 1522 by his cultural translator, Doña Marina, Cortés knew he was capable of fathering children. Cortés's only male heir at this point was illegitimate, but nonetheless named after Cortés's father, Martín Cortés. This son Martín Cortés was also popularly called "El Mestizo".

Catalina Suárez died under mysterious circumstances the night of November 1–2, 1522. There were accusations at the time that Cortés had murdered his wife. There was an investigation into her death, interviewing a variety of household residents and others. The documentation of the investigation was published in the nineteenth century in Mexico and these archival documents were uncovered in the twentieth century. The death of Catalina Suárez produced a scandal and investigation, but Cortés was now free to marry someone of high status more appropriate to his wealth and power. In 1526, he built an imposing residence for himself, the Palace of Cortés in Cuernavaca, in a region close to the capital where he had extensive encomienda holdings. In 1529 he had been accorded the noble designation of don, but more importantly was given the noble title of Marquess of the Valley of Oaxaca and married the Spanish noblewoman Doña Juana de Zúñiga. The marriage produced three children, including another son, who was also named Martín. As the first-born legitimate son, Don Martín Cortés y Zúñiga was now Cortés's heir and succeeded him as holder of the title and estate of the Marquessate of the Valley of Oaxaca. Cortés's legitimate daughters were Doña Maria, Doña Catalina, and Doña Juana.

Cortés and the "Spiritual Conquest" of Mexico
Since the conversion to Christianity of indigenous peoples was an essential and integral part of the extension of Spanish power, making formal provisions for that conversion once the military conquest was completed was an important task for Cortés. During the Age of Discovery, the Catholic Church had seen early attempts at conversion in the Caribbean islands by Spanish friars, particularly the mendicant orders. Cortés made a request to the Spanish monarch to send Franciscan and Dominican friars to Mexico to convert the vast indigenous populations to Christianity. In his fourth letter to the king, Cortés pleaded for friars rather than diocesan or secular priests because those clerics were in his view a serious danger to the Indians' conversion.

If these people [Indians] were now to see the affairs of the Church and the service of God in the hands of canons or other dignitaries, and saw them indulge in the vices and profanities now common in Spain, knowing that such men were the ministers of God, it would bring our Faith into much harm that I believe any further preaching would be of no avail.

He wished the mendicants to be the main evangelists. Mendicant friars did not usually have full priestly powers to perform all the sacraments needed for conversion of the Indians and growth of the neophytes in the Christian faith, so Cortés laid out a solution to this to the king.

Your Majesty should likewise beseech His Holiness [the pope] to grant these powers to the two principal persons in the religious orders that are to come here, and that they should be his delegates, one from the Order of St. Francis and the other from the Order of St. Dominic. They should bring the most extensive powers Your Majesty is able to obtain, for, because these lands are so far from the Church of Rome, and we, the Christians who now reside here and shall do so in the future, are so far from the proper remedies of our consciences and, as we are human, so subject to sin, it is essential that His Holiness should be generous with us and grant to these persons most extensive powers, to be handed down to persons actually in residence here whether it be given to the general of each order or to his provincials.

The Franciscans arrived in May 1524, a symbolically powerful group of twelve known as the Twelve Apostles of Mexico, led by Fray Martín de Valencia. Franciscan Geronimo de Mendieta claimed that Cortés's most important deed was the way he met this first group of Franciscans. The conqueror himself was said to have met the friars as they approached the capital, kneeling at the feet of the friars who had walked from the coast. This story was told by Franciscans to demonstrate Cortés piety and humility and was a powerful message to all, including the Indians, that Cortés's earthly power was subordinate to the spiritual power of the friars. However, one of the first twelve Franciscans, Fray Toribio de Benavente Motolinia does not mention it in his history. Cortés and the Franciscans had a particularly strong alliance in Mexico, with Franciscans seeing him as "the new Moses" for conquering Mexico and opening it to Christian evangelization. In Motolinia's 1555 response to Dominican Bartolomé de Las Casas, he praises Cortés.

And as to those who murmur against the Marqués del Valle [Cortés], God rest him, and who try to blacken and obscure his deeds, I believe that before God their deeds are not as acceptable as those of the Marqués. Although as a human he was a sinner, he had faith and works of a good Christian, and a great desire to employ his life and property in widening and augmenting the fair of Jesus Christ, and dying for the conversion of these gentiles ... Who has loved and defended the Indians of this new world like Cortés? ... Through this captain, God opened the door for us to preach his holy gospel and it was he who caused the Indians to revere the holy sacraments and respect the ministers of the church.

In Fray Bernardino de Sahagún's 1585 revision of the conquest narrative first codified as Book XII of the Florentine Codex, there are laudatory references to Cortés that do not appear in the earlier text from the indigenous perspective. Whereas Book XII of the Florentine Codex concludes with an account of Spaniards' search for gold, in Sahagún's 1585 revised account, he ends with praise of Cortés for requesting the Franciscans be sent to Mexico to convert the Indians.

Expedition to Honduras and aftermath (1524–1541)

Expedition to Honduras (1524–1526)
From 1524 to 1526, Cortés headed an expedition to Honduras where he defeated Cristóbal de Olid, who had claimed Honduras as his own under the influence of the Governor of Cuba Diego Velázquez. Fearing that Cuauhtémoc might head an insurrection in Mexico, he brought him with him to Honduras. In a controversial move, Cuauhtémoc was executed during the journey. Raging over Olid's treason, Cortés issued a decree to arrest Velázquez, whom he was sure was behind Olid's treason. This, however, only served to further estrange the Crown of Castile and the Council of Indies, both of which were already beginning to feel anxious about Cortés's rising power.

Cortés's fifth letter to King Charles attempts to justify his conduct, concludes with a bitter attack on "various and powerful rivals and enemies" who have "obscured the eyes of your Majesty". Charles, who was also Holy Roman Emperor, had little time for distant colonies (much of Charles's reign was taken up with wars with France, the German Protestants and the expanding Ottoman Empire), except insofar as they contributed to finance his wars. In 1521, year of the Conquest, Charles was attending to matters in his German domains and Bishop Adrian of Utrecht functioned as regent in Spain.

Velázquez and Fonseca persuaded the regent to appoint a commissioner (a Juez de residencia, Luis Ponce de León) with powers to investigate Cortés's conduct and even arrest him. Cortés was once quoted as saying that it was "more difficult to contend against [his] own countrymen than against the Aztecs." Governor Diego Velázquez continued to be a thorn in his side, teaming up with Bishop Juan Rodríguez de Fonseca, chief of the Spanish colonial department, to undermine him in the Council of the Indies.

A few days after Cortés's return from his expedition, Ponce de León suspended Cortés from his office of governor of New Spain. The Licentiate then fell ill and died shortly after his arrival, appointing Marcos de Aguilar as alcalde mayor. The aged Aguilar also became sick and appointed Alonso de Estrada governor, who was confirmed in his functions by a royal decree in August 1527. Cortés, suspected of poisoning them, refrained from taking over the government.

Estrada sent Diego de Figueroa to the south. De Figueroa raided graveyards and extorted contributions, meeting his end when the ship carrying these treasures sank. Albornoz persuaded Alonso de Estrada to release Gonzalo de Salazar and Chirinos. When Cortés complained angrily after one of his adherents' hands was cut off, Estrada ordered him exiled. Cortés sailed for Spain in 1528 to appeal to King Charles.

First return to Spain (1528) and Marquessate of the Valley of Oaxaca

In 1528, Cortés returned to Spain to appeal to the justice of his master, Charles V. Juan Altamirano and Alonso Valiente stayed in Mexico and acted as Cortés's representatives during his absence. Cortés presented himself with great splendor before Charles V's court. By this time Charles had returned and Cortés forthrightly responded to his enemy's charges. Denying he had held back on gold due the crown, he showed that he had contributed more than the quinto (one-fifth) required. Indeed, he had spent lavishly to build the new capital of Mexico City on the ruins of the Aztec capital of Tenochtitlán, leveled during the siege that brought down the Aztec empire.

He was received by Charles with every distinction, and decorated with the order of Santiago. In return for his efforts in expanding the still young Spanish Empire, Cortés was rewarded in 1529 by being accorded the noble title of don but more importantly named the "Marqués del Valle de Oaxaca" (Marquess of the Valley of Oaxaca) and married the Spanish noblewoman Doña Juana Zúñiga, after the 1522 death of his much less distinguished first wife, Catalina Suárez. The noble title and senorial estate of the Marquesado was passed down to his descendants until 1811. The Oaxaca Valley was one of the wealthiest regions of New Spain, and Cortés had 23,000 vassals in 23 named encomiendas in perpetuity.

Although confirmed in his land holdings and vassals, he was not reinstated as governor and was never again given any important office in the administration of New Spain. During his travel to Spain, his property was mismanaged by abusive colonial administrators. He sided with local natives in a lawsuit. The natives documented the abuses in the Huexotzinco Codex.

The entailed estate and title passed to his legitimate son Don Martín Cortés upon Cortés's death in 1547, who became the Second Marquess. Don Martín's association with the so-called Encomenderos' Conspiracy endangered the entailed holdings, but they were restored and remained the continuing reward for Hernán Cortés's family through the generations.

Return to Mexico (1530) and appointment of a viceroy (1535)

Cortés returned to Mexico in 1530 with new titles and honors. Although Cortés still retained military authority and permission to continue his conquests, Don Antonio de Mendoza was appointed in 1535 as a viceroy to administer New Spain's civil affairs. This division of power led to continual dissension, and caused the failure of several enterprises in which Cortés was engaged. On returning to Mexico, Cortés found the country in a state of anarchy. There was a strong suspicion in court circles of an intended rebellion by Cortés.

After reasserting his position and reestablishing some sort of order, Cortés retired to his estates at Cuernavaca, about 30 miles (48 km) south of Mexico City. There he concentrated on the building of his palace and on Pacific exploration. Remaining in Mexico between 1530 and 1541, Cortés quarreled with Nuño Beltrán de Guzmán and disputed the right to explore the territory that is today California with Antonio de Mendoza, the first viceroy.

Cortés acquired several silver mines in Zumpango del Rio in 1534. By the early 1540s, he owned 20 silver mines in Sultepec, 12 in Taxco, and 3 in Zacualpan. Earlier, Cortés had claimed the silver in the Tamazula area.

In 1536, Cortés explored the northwestern part of Mexico and discovered the Baja California peninsula. Cortés also spent time exploring the Pacific coast of Mexico. The Gulf of California was originally named the Sea of Cortés by its discoverer Francisco de Ulloa in 1539. This was the last major expedition by Cortés.

Later life and death

Second return to Spain
After his exploration of Baja California, Cortés returned to Spain in 1541, hoping to confound his angry civilians, who had brought many lawsuits against him (for debts, abuse of power, etc.). On his return he went through a crowd to speak to the emperor, who demanded of him who he was. "I am a man," replied Cortés, "who has given you more provinces than your ancestors left you cities."

Expedition against Algiers

The emperor finally permitted Cortés to join him and his fleet commanded by Andrea Doria at the great expedition against Algiers in the Barbary Coast in 1541, which was then part of the Ottoman Empire. During this campaign, Cortés was almost drowned in a storm that hit his fleet while he was pursuing the Pasha of Algiers.

Last years, death, and remains
Having spent a great deal of his own money to finance expeditions, he was now heavily in debt. In February 1544 he made a claim on the royal treasury, but was ignored for the next three years. Disgusted, he decided to return to Mexico in 1547. When he reached Seville, he was stricken with dysentery. He died in Castilleja de la Cuesta, Seville province, on December 2, 1547, from a case of pleurisy at the age of 62.

He left his many mestizo and white children well cared for in his will, along with every one of their mothers. He requested in his will that his remains eventually be buried in Mexico. Before he died he had the Pope remove the "natural" status of four of his children (legitimizing them in the eyes of the church), including Martin, the son he had with Doña Marina (also known as La Malinche), said to be his favourite. His daughter, Doña Catalina, however, died shortly after her father's death.

After his death, his body was moved more than eight times for several reasons. On December 4, 1547, he was buried in the mausoleum of the Duke of Medina in the church of San Isidoro del Campo, Sevilla. Three years later (1550) due to the space being required by the duke, his body was moved to the altar of Santa Catarina in the same church. In his testament, Cortés asked for his body to be buried in the monastery he had ordered to be built in Coyoacan in México, ten years after his death, but the monastery was never built. So in 1566, his body was sent to New Spain and buried in the church of San Francisco de Texcoco, where his mother and one of his sisters were buried.

In 1629, Cortes's last male descendant Don Pedro Cortés, fourth Marquez del Valle, died. The viceroy decided to move the bones of Cortés along with those of his descendant to the Franciscan church in México. This was delayed for nine years, while his body stayed in the main room of the palace of the viceroy. Eventually it was moved to the Sagrario of Franciscan church, where it stayed for 87 years. In 1716, it was moved to another place in the same church. In 1794, his bones were moved to the "Hospital de Jesus" (founded by Cortés), where a statue by Tolsá and a mausoleum were made. There was a public ceremony and all the churches in the city rang their bells.

In 1823, after the independence of México, it seemed imminent that his body would be desecrated, so the mausoleum was removed, the statue and the coat of arms were sent to Palermo, Sicily, to be protected by the Duke of Terranova. The bones were hidden, and everyone thought that they had been sent out of México. In 1836, his bones were moved to another place in the same building.

It was not until November 24, 1946, that they were rediscovered, thanks to the discovery of a secret document by Lucas Alamán. His bones were put in the charge of the Instituto Nacional de Antropología e Historia (INAH). The remains were authenticated by INAH. They were then restored to the same place, this time with a bronze inscription and his coat of arms. When the bones were first rediscovered, the supporters of the Hispanic tradition in Mexico were excited, but one supporter of an indigenist vision of Mexico "proposed that the remains be publicly burned in front of the statue of Cuauhtemoc, and the ashes flung into the air". Following the discovery and authentication of Cortés's remains, there was a discovery of what were described as the bones of Cuauhtémoc, resulting in a "battle of the bones".

On December 16, 1560, the lawsuits related to vassals of the Cortes estate were resolved by a royal order issued by Philip II.

Taxa named after Cortés
Cortés is commemorated in the scientific name of a subspecies of Mexican lizard, Phrynosoma orbiculare cortezii.

Disputed interpretation of his life
There are relatively few sources to the early life of Cortés; his fame arose from his participation in the conquest of Mexico and it was only after this that people became interested in reading and writing about him.

Probably the best source is his letters to the king which he wrote during the campaign in Mexico, but they are written with the specific purpose of putting his efforts in a favourable light and so must be read critically. Another main source is the biography written by Cortés's private chaplain Lopez de Gómara, which was written in Spain several years after the conquest. Gómara never set foot in the Americas and knew only what Cortés had told him, and he had an affinity for knightly romantic stories which he incorporated richly in the biography. The third major source is written as a reaction to what its author calls "the lies of Gomara", the eyewitness account written by the Conquistador Bernal Díaz del Castillo does not paint Cortés as a romantic hero but rather tries to emphasize that Cortés's men should also be remembered as important participants in the undertakings in Mexico.

In the years following the conquest more critical accounts of the Spanish arrival in Mexico were written. The Dominican friar Bartolomé de Las Casas wrote his A Short Account of the Destruction of the Indies which raises strong accusations of brutality and heinous violence towards the Indians; accusations against both the conquistadors in general and Cortés in particular. The accounts of the conquest given in the Florentine Codex by the Franciscan Bernardino de Sahagún and his native informants are also less than flattering towards Cortés. The scarcity of these sources has led to a sharp division in the description of Cortés's personality and a tendency to describe him as either a vicious and ruthless person or a noble and honorable cavalier.

Representations in Mexico

In México there are few representations of Cortés. However, many landmarks still bear his name, from the castle Palacio de Cortés in the city of Cuernavaca to some street names throughout the republic.

The pass between the volcanoes Iztaccíhuatl and Popocatépetl where Cortés took his soldiers on their march to Mexico City. It is known as the Paso de Cortés.

The muralist Diego Rivera painted several representation of him but the most famous, depicts him as a powerful and ominous figure along with Malinche in a mural in the National Palace in Mexico City.

In 1981, President Lopez Portillo tried to bring Cortés to public recognition. First, he made public a copy of the bust of Cortés made by Manuel Tolsá in the Hospital de Jesús Nazareno with an official ceremony, but soon a nationalist group tried to destroy it, so it had to be taken out of the public. Today the copy of the bust is in the "Hospital de Jesús Nazareno" while the original is in Naples, Italy, in the Villa Pignatelli.

Later, another monument, known as "Monumento al Mestizaje" by Julián Martínez y M. Maldonado (1982) was commissioned by Mexican president José López Portillo to be put in the "Zócalo" (Main square) of Coyoacan, near the place of his country house, but it had to be removed to a little known park, the Jardín Xicoténcatl, Barrio de San Diego Churubusco, to quell protests. The statue depicts Cortés, Malinche and their son Martín.

There is another statue by Sebastián Aparicio, in Cuernavaca, was in a hotel "El casino de la selva". Cortés is barely recognizable, so it sparked little interest. The hotel was closed to make a commercial center, and the statue was put out of public display by Costco the builder of the commercial center.

Cultural depictions

Hernán Cortés is a character in the opera La Conquista (2005) by Italian composer Lorenzo Ferrero, which depicts the major episodes of the Spanish conquest of the Aztec Empire in 1521.

Writings: the Cartas de Relación
Cortés's personal account of the conquest of Mexico is narrated in his five letters addressed to Charles V. These five letters, the cartas de relación, are Cortés's only surviving writings. See "Letters and Dispatches of Cortés", translated by George Folsom (New York, 1843); Prescott's "Conquest of Mexico" (Boston, 1843); and Sir Arthur Helps's "Life of Hernando Cortes" (London, 1871).

His first letter was considered lost, and the one from the municipality of Veracruz has to take its place. It was published for the first time in volume IV of "Documentos para la Historia de España", and subsequently reprinted.

The Segunda Carta de Relacion, bearing the date of October 30, 1520, appeared in print at Seville in 1522. The third letter, dated May 15, 1522, appeared at Seville in 1523. The fourth, October 20, 1524, was printed at Toledo in 1525. The fifth, on the Honduras expedition, is contained in volume IV of the Documentos para la Historia de España.

Children
Natural children of Don Hernán Cortés
doña Catalina Pizarro, born between 1514 and 1515 in Santiago de Cuba or maybe later in Nueva España, daughter of an indigenous woman in Cuba, Leonor Pizarro. Doña Catalina married Juan de Salcedo, a conqueror and encomendero, with whom she had a son, Pedro.
don Martín Cortés, born in Coyoacán in 1522, son of doña Marina (La Malinche), called the First Mestizo; about him was written The New World of Martín Cortés; married doña Bernaldina de Porras and had two children:
doña Ana Cortés
don Fernando Cortés, Principal Judge of Veracruz. Descendants of this line are alive today in Mexico.
don Luis Cortés, born in 1525, son of doña Antonia or Elvira Hermosillo, a native of Trujillo (Cáceres)
doña Leonor Cortés Moctezuma, born in 1527 or 1528 in Ciudad de Mexico, daughter of Aztec princess Tecuichpotzin (baptized Isabel), born in Tenochtitlan on July 11, 1510, and died on July 9, 1550, the eldest legitimate daughter of Moctezuma II Xocoyotzin and wife doña María Miahuaxuchitl; married to Juan de Tolosa, a Basque merchant and miner.
doña María Cortés de Moctezuma, daughter of an Aztec princess; nothing more is known about her except that she probably was born with some deformity.

He married twice: firstly in Cuba to Catalina Suárez Marcaida, who died at Coyoacán in 1522 without issue, and secondly in 1529 to doña Juana Ramírez de Arellano de Zúñiga, daughter of don Carlos Ramírez de Arellano, 2nd Count of Aguilar and wife the Countess doña Juana de Zúñiga, and had:
don Luis Cortés y Ramírez de Arellano, born in Texcoco in 1530 and died shortly after his birth.
doña Catalina Cortés de Zúñiga, born in Cuernavaca in 1531 and died shortly after her birth.
don Martín Cortés y Ramírez de Arellano, 2nd Marquess of the Valley of Oaxaca, born in Cuernavaca in 1532, married at Nalda on February 24, 1548, his twice cousin once removed doña Ana Ramírez de Arellano y Ramírez de Arellano and had issue, currently extinct in male line
doña María Cortés de Zúñiga, born in Cuernavaca between 1533 and 1536, married to don Luis de Quiñones y Pimentel, 5th Count of Luna
doña Catalina Cortés de Zúñiga, born in Cuernavaca between 1533 and 1536, died unmarried in Sevilla after the funeral of her father
doña Juana Cortés de Zúñiga, born in Cuernavaca between 1533 and 1536, married Don Fernando Enríquez de Ribera y Portocarrero, 2nd Duke of Alcalá de los Gazules, 3rd Marquess of Tarifa and 6th Count of Los Molares, and had issue

In popular culture
 Cortés was portrayed (as "Hernando Cortez") by actor Cesar Romero in the 1947 historical adventure film Captain from Castile.
 "Cortez the Killer", a 1975 song by Neil Young
 Cortés is a major villain in the 2000 animated movie The Road to El Dorado, voiced by Jim Cummings
 Cortes played by Óscar Jaenada, is a morally ambiguous protagonist in the 2019 8 episode TV-series Hernán.
 In 1986, Polish illustrator Jerzy Wróblewski created a 48-page comic book titled Hernán Cortés i podbój Meksyku (Hernán Cortés and the Conquest of Mexico). The comic book, based on historical chronicles, narrated Cortés's life, concentrating on the titular 1519–1521 period; it was noted for its realistic depictions of violence, unusual in Polish comic books of the era.
 Cortés features in the 1980 novel Aztec by Gary Jennings as an antagonist.
 Cortés is the villain of "Idol of Death", an episode of The Time Tunnel.

See also

History of Mexico
History of Mexico City
New Spain
Palace of Cortés, Cuernavaca
Spanish conquest of the Aztec empire
Spanish Empire

Notes

References

Further reading

Primary sources

Cortés, Hernán. Letters – available as Letters from Mexico translated by Anthony Pagden. Yale University Press, 1986. . Available online in Spanish from an 1866 edition.
Cortés, Hernán. Escritos sueltos de Hernán Cortés. Biblioteca Histórica de la Iberia. vol 12. Mexico 1871.
Díaz del Castillo, Bernal. The Conquest of New Spain – available as The Discovery and Conquest of Mexico: 1517–1521 
Díaz del Castillo, Bernal, Carrasco, David, Rolena. Adorno, Sandra Messinger Cypess, and Karen Vieira Powers. The History of the Conquest of New Spain. Albuquerque: University of New Mexico Press, 2008  
 (textbook anthology of indigenous primary sources)
López de Gómara, Francisco, Cortés: The Life of the Conqueror by His Secretary, Ed. and trans. Lesley Byrd Simpson. Berkeley: University of California Press 1964.
López de Gómara, Francisco. Hispania Victrix; First and Second Parts of the General History of the Indies, with the whole discovery and notable things that have happened since they were acquired until the year 1551, with the conquest of Mexico and New Spain University of California Press, 1966
Prescott, William H. History of the Conquest of Mexico, with a Preliminary View of Ancient Mexican Civilization, and the Life of the Conqueror, Hernando Cortes
Last Will and Testament of Hernán Cortés
Letter From Hernán Cortés to Charles the V
Hernán Cortés Power of Attorney, 1526 From the Rare Book and Special Collections Division at the Library of Congress
 Praeclara Ferdinandi Cortesii de noua maris oceani Hyspania narratio sacratissimo... 1524. From the Rare Book and Special Collections Division at the Library of Congress

Secondary sources

Boruchoff, David A. "Hernán Cortés." International Encyclopedia of the Social Sciences, 2nd. ed. (2008), vol. 2, pp. 146–149.
Brooks, Francis J. "Motecuzoma Xocoyotl, Hernán Cortés, and Bernal Díaz del Castillo: The Construction of an Arrest." Hispanic American Historical Review (1995): 149–183.
Chamberlain, Robert S. "Two unpublished documents of Hernán Cortés and New Spain, 1519 and 1524." Hispanic American Historical Review 19 (1939) 120–137.
Chamberlain, Robert S. "La controversia entre Cortés y Velázquez sobre la gobernación de Nueva España, 1519–1522" in Anales de la Sociedad de Geografía e Historia de Guatemala, vol XIX 1943.
Cline, Howard F. "Hernando Cortés and the Aztec indians in Spain." The Quarterly Journal of the Library of Congress. Vol. 26. No. 2. Library of Congress, 1969.
Denhardt. Robert Moorman. "The equine strategy of Cortés." Hispanic American Historical Review 18 (1938) 550–555.
Elliott, J.H., "The mental world of Hernán Cortés." In Transactions of the Royal Historical Society. Fifth Series (1967) 41–58.
Frankl, Victor. "Hernán Cortés y la tradición de las Siete Partidas." Revista de Historia de América 53–54 (1962) 9–74.
Himmerich y Valencia, Robert. The Encomenderos of New Spain, 1521–1555, Austin: University of Texas Press 1991
Jacobs, W.J. Hernando Cortés.  New York: Franklin Watts, Inc. 1974.
Keen, Benjamin, The Aztecs Image in Western Thought, New Brunswick: Rutgers University Press 1971.
Konetzke, Richard. "Hernán Cortés como poblador de la Nueva España." Estudios Cortesianos, pp. 341–381. Madrid 1948.
Levy, Buddy. Conquistador: Hernán Cortés, King Montezuma, and the Last Stand of the Aztecs.  2008 
Lorenzana, Francisco Antonio. Viaje de Hernán Cortés a la Peninsula de Californias. Mexico 1963
MacNutt, F.A. Fernando Cortés and the Conquest of Mexico, 1485–1547. New York and London 1909.
Madariaga, Salvador de. Hernán Cortés, Conqueror of Mexico. Mexico 1942.
Marks, Richard Lee. Cortés: The Great Adventurer and the Fate of Aztec Mexico. Alfred A. Knopf, 1993.
Mathes, W. Michael, ed. The Conquistador in California: 1535. The Voyage of Fernando Cortés to Baja California in Chronicles and Documents. Vol. 31. Dawson's Book Shop, 1973.
Maura, Juan Francisco."Cobardía, falsedad y opportunismo español: algunas consideraciones sobre la "verdadera" historia de la conquista de la Nueva España" Lemir (Revista de literatura medieval y del Renacimiento) 7 (2003): 1–29.
Medina, José Toribio. Ensayo Bio–bibliográfico sobre Hernán Cortés. Introducción de Guillermo Feliú Cruz. Santiago de Chile 1952.
Miller, Robert Ryal. "Cortés and the first attempt to colonize California." Calif Hist QJ Calif Hist Soc 53.1 (1974): 4–16.
Petrov, Lisa. For an Audience of Men: Masculinity, Violence and Memory in Hernán Cortés's Las Cartas de Relación and Carlos Fuentes's Fictional Cortés. University of Wisconsin—Madison, 2004.
Phelan, John Leddy The Millennial Kingdom of the Franciscans in the New World, chapter 3, "Hernán Cortés, the Moses of the New World," Berkeley: University of California Press, second edition, revised, 1971, pp. 33–34.

Restall, Matthew. Seven Myths of the Spanish Conquest Oxford University Press (2003) 
Silva, José Valerio. El legalismo de Hernán Cortés como instrumento de su conquista. Mexico 1965.
Stein, R.C. The World's Greatest Explorers: Hernando Cortés.  Illinois: Chicago Press Inc. 1991.
Thomas, Hugh (1993). Conquest: Cortés, Montezuma, and the Fall of Old Mexico 
Todorov, TzvetanThe Conquest of America (1996) 
Toro, Alfonso. Un crimen de Hernán Cortés. La muerte de Doña Catalina Xuárez Marcaida, estudio histórico y medico legal. Mexico 1922
Wagner, H.R. "The lost first letter of Cortés." Hispanic American Historical Review. 21 (1941) 669–672.
White, Jon Manchip. (1971) Cortés and the Downfall of the Aztec Empire

External links

 The letters by Cortés, in which Cortés describes the events related to the conquest of Mexico
Genealogy of Hernán Cortés
Origin of the Surname Cortés
The change of Hernán Cortés's self-image by means of the conquest
Hernando Cortes on the Web – web directory with thumbnail galleries
Conquistadors, with Michael Wood – website for 2001 PBS documentary
Ibero-American Electronic Text Series presented online by the University of Wisconsin Digital Collections Center.
Hernan Cortes – The Conquistador of the Aztecs; Informational Link Blog about the History of Cortes, the Aztecs along with a variety of sources, pictures and educational resources
Latin American studies center, material on Cortés
Fernand Cortez opera by Gaspare Spontini, Jean-Paul Penin
"Cortes, Hernando" Belinda H. Nanney
"Hernán Cortés, marqués del Valle de Oaxaca", Encyclopædia Britannica

1485 births
1547 deaths
People from Las Vegas Altas
16th-century Mexican people
16th-century Spanish people
History of the Aztecs
Spanish city founders
Colonial Mexico
Deaths from dysentery
Encomenderos
Explorers of Mexico
Extremaduran conquistadors
History of Baja California
History of the Gulf of California
Marquesses of Spain
People from Morelos
Spanish conquistadors
Spanish generals
Spanish regicides
Titles of nobility in the Americas
Etymology of California
Quetzalcoatl